Patrick White (1860–1935) was an Irish Nationalist politician.  A member of the Irish Parliamentary Party, he was Member of Parliament (MP) for North Meath from 1900 to 1918.

He was elected to the United Kingdom House of Commons at the general election in October 1900, narrowly defeating (by 2324 votes to 2292) the outgoing MP James Gibney, who had stood as a Healyite Nationalist. White was re-elected unopposed at the next three general elections, but did not stand again  in 1918.

References

External links 
 

1860 births
1935 deaths
Irish Parliamentary Party MPs
UK MPs 1900–1906
UK MPs 1906–1910
UK MPs 1910
UK MPs 1910–1918
Members of the Parliament of the United Kingdom for County Meath constituencies (1801–1922)